Brandon Whitt (born October 15, 1982) is an American former stock car racing driver. A third-generation racer, he has run in all three of NASCAR's top divisions. He is the older cousin of former NASCAR Cup Series driver Cole Whitt.

Racing career

Whitt won the Rookie of the Year title in NASCAR's Southwest Touring division in 2002 while attending college, and made his Craftsman Truck Series debut in 2003, driving the #38 Chevrolet Silverado for Clean Line Motorsports, a team his father owned. He finished thirteenth in his debut, and ran six additional races that season, his best finish a thirteenth at California Speedway.

In 2004, Whitt and his team ran the Truck Series full-time with sponsorship from McMillin Homes and running Ford F-150s. Despite not finishing any race higher than 12th in his rookie season, Whitt finished 19th in the final standings.

During the 2005 season, his team was purchased by Jeff Hammond and Tom DeLoach, renamed Red Horse Racing and switched to Toyota. He won his first race at Memphis Motorsports Park (from the pole) after taking the lead from a spinning Ron Hornaday Jr. on the last lap. He was dismissed from the team at the end of the season, leaving him out of a ride. However, Whitt soon signed with ARCA Racing Series team CLR Racing. In 2006, he attempted his first NEXTEL Cup race at Phoenix International Raceway with CJM Racing and qualified 37th, but finished 43rd. He was scheduled to run with CJM for 12 races in 2007, but those plans changed when Whitt was released from the ride. Whitt drove one race later that season for Red Horse at Atlanta, where he finished twenty-third.

Midway through 2008, he signed to drive for Specialty Racing in the Nationwide Series. On June 22, 2009, Whitt announced that he has left Specialty Racing and the #61 team.  He has not raced since.

Motorsports career results

NASCAR
(key) (Bold – Pole position awarded by qualifying time. Italics – Pole position earned by points standings or practice time. * – Most laps led.)

Nextel Cup Series

Daytona 500

Nationwide Series

Craftsman Truck Series

ARCA Re/Max Series
(key) (Bold – Pole position awarded by qualifying time. Italics – Pole position earned by points standings or practice time. * – Most laps led.)

References

External links
 

Living people
1982 births
Sportspeople from El Cajon, California
Racing drivers from California
NASCAR drivers
ASCAR drivers
ARCA Menards Series drivers